Barmøya or Barmen is a small island in Stad Municipality in Vestland county, Norway. The  island lies just off the mainland between the Stad peninsula and the island of Vågsøy. Most of the island's 50 or so residents live on the southern shore in a small village that is known as Barmen. There is a small car ferry that runs from Barmen to the mainland  to the south.

See also
List of islands of Norway

References

Stad, Norway
Islands of Vestland